Huntleya burtii, also known as the cat-face orchid, is a species of orchid that occurs in Honduras, Nicaragua, Panama and Costa Rica. It has beautiful fan-shaped growth and bears single, large, glossy flowers on 6" spikes. The long-lived, fragrant blooms may reach 5" across and are red-brown with yellow spotting toward the top, fading to white spotting toward the bottom. These plants usually grow at elevations of 900–3,600 feet and prefer warm, moderately bright environments.

References

burtii